The Italian Women's Volleyball League Serie A1, is the highest women's volleyball league in Italy. It is organized and administrated by the Italian Volleyball Federation (FIPAV). It is considered one of the oldest women's top national leagues in European volleyball, being established in 1946, and its clubs have achieved significant success in the continental European club competitions.

History

Format
The league was originally played in a single round-robin format, with all clubs placed in a single group. As more clubs joined the league, the format changed to an initial stage composed of various groups with clubs advancing to a final group for the title. In 1983 a play-off format was introduced, with all clubs playing a regular season in a single group and the best teams advancing to the play-offs.

Teams
Teams of the 2022–23 season.

Results

Note: Since a play-off format without a third place match was introduced in the 1983–84 season, the column "Third" in the table display the two losing playoffs semifinalists, with the club having the best regular season record appearing first.  
Sources: Federazione Italiana Pallavolo (for champions), Lega Pallavolo Serie A Femminile (for champions and play-offs) and The-Sports.org (for runners-up and third places)

Titles by club

All-time team records

Winners and finalists by city since 1945/1946

Since 2009/10:

(Based on W=2 pts and D=1 pts)

References

External links
  
  
  Italian Serie A1. women.volleybox.net 

 

 
Italy
1946 establishments in Italy
Women's volleyball leagues in Italy
Italy A1